The Rajput-class guided-missile destroyers built for the Indian Navy are modified versions of Soviet s. They are also known as Kashin-II class. The ships were built in the former Soviet Union after considerable Indian design modifications to the Kashin design. These included the replacement of the helicopter pad in the original design with a flight elevator, as well as major changes to the electronics and combat systems. Five units were built for export to India in the 1980s. All units are currently attached to the Eastern Naval Command.

Service history
The Rajput class inherited their anti-aircraft and anti-submarine warfare roles for aircraft carrier task-force defense against submarines, low-flying aircraft, and cruise missiles from the Kashin class.
They were the first ships in the Indian Navy to deploy the BrahMos supersonic cruise missile systems. The systems were deployed during a mid-life refit of the ships. Ranvijay was deployed with an updated vertical launcher for the BrahMos missile. The Indian Navy is planning to upgrade the propulsion of the Rajput-class ships with indigenously developed Kaveri Marine Gas Turbine (KMGT) engine. The Gas Turbine Research Establishment of DRDO has been developing this engine which is currently in testing phase.

During TROPEX-21 exercise of the Indian Navy, the decommissioned Ranjit was sunk by a torpedo.

 was decommissioned from the service on 21 May 2021.

Ships of the class

See also
 List of active Indian Navy ships
 List of destroyers of India
 List of naval ship classes in service

References

External links
Rajput class destroyer - Bharat-Rakshak.com
Rajput class destroyer @ GlobalSecurity.org
  All Kashin-II Class Destroyers - Complete Ship List

Destroyer classes
 
India–Soviet Union relations
Destroyers of the Soviet Union
Destroyers of India